There are a number of words and phrases in the Book of Mormon that are anachronistic—their existence in the text of the Book of Mormon is at odds with known linguistic patterns or archaeological findings.

Each of the anachronisms is a word, phrase, artifact, or other concept that mainstream historians, archaeologists, or linguists believe did not exist in the Americas during the time period in which the Book of Mormon claims to have been written.

Latter Day Saint scholars and apologists responded to the anachronisms in several ways. Depending on the anachronism in question, apologists attempt to: establish parallels to currently known ancient cultures, technologies, plants or animals; reframe the usage of individual words in question; question assumptions that may lead to an apparent anachronism; or point out that it is not known exactly where the Book of Mormon actually took place (and so supporting evidence simply remains to be found - see Limited geography model).

The list below summarizes the most prominent anachronisms, as well as perspectives of Latter Day Saint scholars and common apologetic rebuttals.

Background
According to Joseph Smith, the Book of Mormon was originally engraved on golden plates, which he received in 1827 from an angel named Moroni, whom Smith identified as a resurrected former inhabitant of the American continent. Smith claimed to translate the original text of the plates into English; the book says that a portion of the text was written on the plates in "reformed Egyptian".

The Book of Mormon is said to have taken place somewhere in the Americas from c. 2500 BC to 420 AD, thus placing its events within the pre-Columbian era.

Mainstream scholarly consensus is that the book's origin lies firmly in the 19th century and that Smith created it with the resources available to him, including the standard English translation of the Bible at the time, the King James Version (KJV).

No manuscripts in the original language of the Book of Mormon are known to exist. No manuscripts or plates containing text similar to Egyptian or Hebrew have ever been excavated in the New World. Outside of Mormon scholars, there is a wide consensus that the archaeological record does not support the historicity of the Book of Mormon, and in most ways directly contradicts it.

Smith stated that "the Book of Mormon is the most correct of any book on Earth", a claim repeated in modern introductions to the book. Modern apologists affirm that "when Joseph Smith referred to the Book of Mormon as the 'most correct book' on earth, he was referring to the principles that it teaches, not the accuracy of its textual structure", and therefore readers should not expect it to be "without any errors in grammar, spelling, punctuation, clarity of phrasing, [or] other such ways." Indeed, the original title page of the Book of Mormon claims that "if there are faults [in the book] they are the mistakes of men".

Historical anachronisms

Quoting Isaiah

Book of Mormon prophets quote chapters 48 through 54 of the Book of Isaiah after having left Jerusalem around 600 BC. Since Isaiah died around 698 BC, under traditional biblical belief, there would be no conflict. The prevailing scholarly opinion is that these chapters were not written by Isaiah, but rather by one or more other people during the Babylonian captivity, sometime between 586 and 538 BC (between 14 and 82 years after it could have been known to the Book of Mormon prophets).

Apologetic perspective
Apologetics hold that there is not complete unanimity on this point. Some conservative Biblical scholars still assert that Isaiah authored the entire book.

Baptism
Baptism is mentioned as a ritual that is taught and performed among the Nephite civilization, with its first mention being taught by Nephi between 559 and 545 BC. Some have commented that baptism as a part of conversion was not customary until after the Babylonian captivity. However, research by Everett Ferguson (2009) has concluded that "the date for the origin of proselyte baptism cannot be determined." The Babylonian captivity occurred subsequent to the departure of the Lehites recounted in the Book of Mormon.

Both Christian and Rabbinic baptism is rooted in the washings in Leviticus, which traditional Biblical timelines date to approximately 1445 BC although current texts are considered to date from the Persian period, which began about 539 BC.  A practice similar to baptism is known to have been practiced by the Jewish Essenes between the 2nd century BC and the 1st century AD. The Jewish Encyclopedia compares Christian baptism to ancient Jewish purification and initiation rites involving immersion in water, and states that "Baptism was practised in ancient (Hasidean or Essene) Judaism".

Dating of known historical events
The Book of Mormon chronology accounts for 600 years from the time that Lehi "came out" of Jerusalem to the birth of Jesus Christ, which contradicts the timing of known historical events. Lehi is said to have left Jerusalem in the first year of the reign of Zedekiah, which occurred in 597 BC.  The date of birth of Jesus was no later than 4 BC, based on the Bible stating that it occurred during the reign of Herod the Great, who died in 4 BC.

Apologetic perspective
A few LDS Church scholars account for this apparent discrepancy by arguing that the Nephite calendar was a lunar calendar (354.37 days in a year) during that time period which equates to 582.12 solar years, and that the Lehi departure was just prior to the final destruction of Jerusalem circa 587 BC.  The reference in 3 Nephi is referring to Lehi's first leaving of Jerusalem to receive his prophetic calling.

Flora and fauna anachronisms

Horses

There are several instances where horses are mentioned in the Book of Mormon, and are portrayed as being in the forest upon first arrival of the Nephites, "raise(d)", "fed", "prepared" (in conjunction with chariots), used for food, and being "useful unto man". There is no evidence that horses existed on the American continent during the time frame of the Book of Mormon. While there were horses in North America during the Pleistocene, and modern horses partly evolved in the Americas, fossil records show that they became extinct on the American continent approximately 10,000 years ago. Horses did not reappear in the Americas until the Spaniards brought them from Europe. They were brought to the Caribbean by Christopher Columbus in 1493, and to the American continent by Hernán Cortés in 1519.

Apologetic perspective
Apologist Paul R. Cheesman and one non-LDS scientist, Clayton Ray, assert that there is evidence that some New World horses may have survived the Pleistocene–Holocene transition. Ray stated that "It is by no means implied that pre-Columbian horses were known to the Mayans, but it seems likely that horses were present on the Yucatan Peninsula in pre-Mayan times", that is, before the BOM chronology. Brigham Young University anthropologist Deanne G. Matheny wrote that the fragmentary horse teeth discussed by Ray "are considered pre-Columbian. Due to the degree of mineralization which was greater than that of any bone or tooth found near them, they are thought to be of Pleistocene age. Ray suggests that the Maya may have picked up the fossil teeth as curios and transported them to the site. At this point then there is no convincing evidence that the horse survived until the period of the Mesoamerican civilizations.

Others believe that the word "horse" in the Book of Mormon does not refer to members of the genus Equus but instead to other animals such as deer or tapirs.

FARMS apologist Robert R. Bennett stated that as a comparison, the famed horses of the Huns did not leave any archaeological trace yet numbered in the thousands. However, archaeological remains of horses have been found at the Hun sites of Boroo Gol and Mankhan, as well as at grave sites directly preceding the Huns, whereas no such archaeological remains of horses have ever been found in the Americas.

Bennett also draws an analogy by discussing the limited evidence of "lions" in Palestine: "The biblical narrative mentions lions, yet it was not until very recently that the only other evidence for lions in Palestine was pictographic or literary. Before the announcement in a 1988 publication of two bone samples, there was no archaeological evidence to confirm the existence of lions in that region."

Elephants

Elephants are mentioned twice in a single verse in the Book of Ether and are indicated to be at least semi-domesticated. Mastodons and mammoths lived in the New World during the Pleistocene and the very early Holocene with a disappearance of the Mastodon from North America about 10,500 years ago where recent eDNA research of sediments indicates mammoths survived in north central Siberia at least as late as 2000 BC, in continental northeast Siberia until at least 5300 BC, and until at least 6600 BC in North America. The fossil record indicates that they became extinct along with most of the megafauna towards the end of the last ice age. The source of this extinction, known as the Holocene extinction is speculated to be the result of human predation, a significant climate change, or a combination of both factors. It is known that a small population of mammoths survived on Saint Paul Island, Alaska, up until 5725 BP (3705 BC), but this date is more than 1000 years before the Jaredite record in the Book of Mormon begins.

Apologist perspective and discussion
The main point of contention is how late these animals were present in the Americas before becoming extinct, with Mormon authors asserting that a population island of these animals continued to exist into Jaredite times.

Various Mormon authors have cited evidence that North American mound-builder cultures were familiar with the elephant. The oldest mound-builder societies date to around 2000 BC. The mound builder/elephant controversy did not originate with the Book of Mormon. In The Mound Builders, Their Works and Relics, author Stephen Dennison Peet cites instances of exhumed mastodon remains and arguments given for why the remains were believed to be contemporary with mound builders. Elephant effigy pipes, of the characteristic mound builder platform style, were reported as archaeological finds in Iowa, and many have readily identified the animal depicted in the shape of the Wisconsin "elephant mound", though others question whether this is in fact the animal represented. The former Iowa state archaeologist Marshall McKusick discusses the evidence indicating that the elephant platform pipes are frauds in his book on the so-called Davenport Tablets.

The co-existence of man and elephantine animals is congruent with the archaeological record, but does not address the anachronism, since the dates of all elephantine remains in the Americas have been placed well before their mention in the Book of Mormon.

There are instances of stories preserved orally by Native Americans which some Mormon scholars believe may describe elephants. One such story is related by the Naskapi Indian Tribe, located in eastern Quebec and the Labrador region of Canada. The story concerns a monster from the Naskapi tradition called "Katcheetohuskw", which is described as being very large, with large ears, teeth and a long nose. Similar versions of "monster" legends related by other tribes refer to a monster called "Ursida", which is described as more of a large, stiff-legged bear rather than a mammoth. The story of the "monster bear" is considered by some scholars to be purely mythical. Delaware and other native American legends of the mastodon are likewise said to exist.

Cattle and cows
There are five separate instances of "cows" or "cattle" in the New World in the Book of Mormon, including verbiage that they were "raise(d)" and were "for the use of man" or "useful for the food of man", and indicates that "cattle" and "cows" were not considered the same animal. Critics argue that there is no evidence that Old World cattle (members of the genus Bos) inhabited the New World prior to European contact in the 16th century AD.

Apologist perspective
Apologists argue that the term "cattle" may be more generic than suggesting members of the genus Bos, and may have referred to bison, mountain goats, llamas, or other American species. According to the Book of Mormon, "cattle" could be found in ancient America. However, no species of bison is known to have been domesticated and there is no evidence for the domestication of any other large mammal in the pre-Columbian Americas except for the llama and alpaca which, as members of the camel family, would have been unclean and unsuitable for keeping the Law of Moses (Leviticus 11:4).

Goats

There are four mentions of the existence of goats in the Book of Mormon.  The Jaredites noted goats "were useful for the food of man" (approximately 2300 BC), the Nephites did "find" "the goat and the wild goat" upon arrival (approximately 589 BC) and later "raise(d)" "goats and wild goats" (approximately 500 BC), and the goat was mentioned allegorically (approximately 80 BC).

Domesticated goats are not native to the Americas, having been domesticated in prehistoric times on the Eurasian continent. Domesticated goats are believed to have been introduced on the American continent upon the arrival of the Europeans in the 15th century, 1000 years after the conclusion of the Book of Mormon, and nearly 2000 years after they are last mentioned in the Book of Mormon. The mountain goat is indigenous to North America and has been hunted, and the fleece used for clothing.  However it has never been domesticated, and is known for being aggressive towards humans.

Apologist perspective
Matthew Roper, a FARMS writer, discussed the topic of goats in his article, "Deer as 'Goat' and Pre-Columbian Domesticate". He noted that when early Spanish explorers visited the southeastern United States they found Native Americans herding tame deer:
In all these regions they visited, the Spaniards noticed herds of deer similar to our herds of cattle. These deer bring forth and nourish their young in the houses of the natives. During the daytime they wander freely through the woods in search of their food, and in the evening they come back to their little ones, who have been cared for, allowing themselves to be shut up in the courtyards and even to be milked, when they have suckled their fawns. The only milk the natives know is that of the does, from which they make cheese.

Roper based his arguments on anecdotes from early Spanish colonists which called native Mesoamerican brocket deer goats: "Friar Diego de Landa noted, 'There are wild goats which the Indians call yuc.'" He quoted another friar in the late 16th century, "in Yucatán 'there are in that province ... great numbers of deer, and small goats'".

Yale anthropologist Marion Schwartz noted that in the Americas "The white-tailed deer is a good example of an animal whose solitary behavior precludes its domestication even though it prefers to live in areas that people have opened up. Deer have been tamed and herded but not truly domesticated."

Swine

"Swine" are referred to twice in the Book of Mormon, and states that the swine were "useful for the food of man" among the Jaredites. There have not been any remains, references, artwork, tools, or any other evidence suggesting that swine were ever present in the pre-Columbian New World.

Apologist perspective
Apologists note that peccaries (also known as javelinas), which bear a superficial resemblance to pigs and are in the same subfamily Suinae as swine, have been present in South America since prehistoric times. Mormon authors advocating the mound-builder setting for the Book of Mormon have similarly suggested North American peccaries (also called "wild pigs") as the "swine" of the Jaredites. The earliest scientific description of peccaries in the New World is in Brazil in 1547 and referred to them as "wild pigs".

Though it has not been documented that peccaries were bred in captivity, it has been documented that peccaries were tamed, penned, and raised for food and ritual purposes in the Yucatan, Panama, the southern Caribbean, and Colombia at the time of the Conquest. Archaeological remains of peccaries have been found in Mesoamerica from the Preclassic (or Formative) period up until immediately before Spanish contact. Specifically, peccary remains have been found at Early Formative Olmec civilization sites, which civilization is thought by some Mormon apologists to correlate to the Jaredites.

Barley and wheat

Grains are mentioned 28 times in the Book of Mormon, including "barley" and "wheat". The introduction of domesticated modern barley and wheat to the New World was made by Europeans sometime after 1492, many centuries after the time in which the Book of Mormon is set.

Apologist perspective
FARMS scholar Robert Bennett offered two possible explanations for this anachronism:
Research on this matter supports two possible explanations. First, the terms barley and wheat, as used in the Book of Mormon, may refer to certain other New World crop plants that were given Old World designations; and second, the terms may refer to genuine varieties of New World barley and wheat. For example, the Spanish called the fruit of the prickly pear cactus a "fig," and emigrants from England called maize "corn," an English term referring to grains in general. A similar practice may have been employed when Book of Mormon people encountered New World plant species for the first time.

Bennett also postulates that references to "barley" could refer to Hordeum pusillum, also known as "little barley", a species of grass native to the Americas. The seeds are edible, and this plant was part of the pre-Columbian Eastern Agricultural Complex of cultivated plants used by Native Americans. Hordeum pusillum was unknown in Mesoamerica, where there is no evidence of pre-Columbian barley cultivation. Evidence exists that this plant was cultivated in North America in the Woodland periods contemporary with mound-builder societies (early centuries AD) and has been carbon-dated to 2,500 years ago, although it is questionable whether it was ever domesticated. Little barley samples that date to 900 AD were also found in Phoenix, Arizona, and samples from Southern Illinois date between 1 and 900 AD.

Technology anachronisms

Chariots

The Book of Mormon mentions the presence of "chariots" in three instances, in two instances (both around 90 BC at the same location) inferring them as a mode of transportation. There is no archaeological evidence to support the use of wheeled vehicles in pre-Columbian Mesoamerica. Many parts of ancient Mesoamerica were not suitable for wheeled transport. Clark Wissler, the Curator of Ethnography at the American Museum of Natural History in New York City, noted: "we see that the prevailing mode of land transport in the New World was by human carrier. The wheel was unknown in pre-Columbian times."

Apologist perspective
A broader claim that wheels did not exist in pre-Columbian Mesoamerica is incorrect. Wheels were used in a limited context in Mesoamerica for what were probably ritual objects, "small clay animal effigies mounted on wheels." Richard Diehl and Margaret Mandeville have documented the archaeological discovery of wheeled toys in Teotihuacan, Tres Zapotes, Veracruz, and Panuco in Mesoamerica. Some of these wheeled toys were referred to by Smithsonian archaeologist William Henry Holmes and archaeologist Désiré Charnay as "chariots".  While these items establish that the concept of the wheel was known in ancient Mesoamerica, lack of suitable draft animals and a terrain unsuitable for wheeled traffic are the probable reasons that wheeled transport was never developed."

A comparison of the South American Inca civilization to Mesoamerican civilizations shows the same lack of wheeled vehicles. Although the Incas used a vast network of paved roads, these roads are so rough, steep, and narrow that they were likely unsuitable for wheeled use. Bridges that the Inca people built, and even continue to use and maintain today in some remote areas, are straw-rope bridges so narrow (about 2–3 feet wide) that no wheeled vehicle can fit. Inca roads were used mainly by chaski message runners and llama caravans. Mayan paved roads at Yucatan had characteristics which could allow the use of wheeled vehicles, but there is no evidence that those highways were used other than by people on foot and nobles who were borne on litters.

One Mormon researcher responds to the lack of evidence with a comparison to biblical archaeology, suggesting that though there are no archaeological evidences that any of the numerous ancient American civilizations used wheeled transportation, few chariot fragments have been found in the Middle East dating to biblical times (apart from the disassembled chariots found in Tutankhamun's tomb). Although few fragments of chariots have been found in the Middle East, there are many images of ancient chariots on pottery and frescoes and in many sculptures of Mediterranean origin, thus confirming their existence in those societies. Chariots are absent in pre-Columbian frescoes, pottery and artwork found in the New World.

Referencing the discovery of wheeled chariot "toys" in Mayan funerary settings, Mormon scholar William J. Hamblin has suggested that the "chariots" mentioned in the Book of Mormon might refer to mythic or cultic wheeled vehicles.

Mormon scholar Brant Gardner has asserted that the Book of Mormon "chariot" may be a palanquin or litter vehicle, since the Book of Mormon makes no reference to the specific use of the wheel.

Silk

The Book of Mormon mentions the use of "silk" in the New World four times. Most commercial silk comes from the cocoon of one of several Asian moths, predominantly Bombyx mori; this type of silk was unknown in pre-Columbian America.

Apologist perspective
Mormon scholar John L. Sorenson documents several materials which were used in Mesoamerica to make fine cloth equivalent to silk, some of which the Spanish actually called "silk" upon their arrival, including the fiber (kapok) from the seed pods of the ceiba tree, the cocoons of wild moths, the fibers of silkgrass (Achmea magdalenae), the leaves of the wild pineapple plant, and the fine hair of the underbelly of rabbits. He alleges that the inhabitants of Mexico used the fiber spun by a wild silkworm to create a fabric.

The Aztecs, Mixtecs and Zapotecs used and traded a silk material taken from the large nests made by two indigenous insects, the moth Eucheira socialis and the butterfly Gloveria psidii.  The nests were cut and pieced together to make a fabric, rather than extracting and weaving the fiber as in modern silk.  Weaving of silk from what are thought to be the same insects has been reported in more recent times, though its use in pre-Columbian times has been debated.

Compass
The Book of Mormon also states that a "compass" or "Liahona" was used by Nephi in the 6th-century BC. The compass is widely recognized to have been invented in China around 1100 AD, and remains of a compass have never been found in America. In the Book of Alma, Alma explains to his son that "our fathers called it Liahona, which is, being interpreted, a compass".

Apologist perspective
Apologists counter that Liahona was, according to the narrative, created by God, and not by the Nephites. Also, unlike a normal compass, the Book of Mormon says that there was also writing on the ball that displayed instructions from God, and there was no mention of any part of it pointing to a geographic point. Recent speculation has raised the possibility of the Liahona being a form of astrolabe which are indicated to have existed during Lehi's time frame.

Windows
The Book of Mormon describes that the Jaredite people were familiar with the concept of "windows" near the time of the biblical Tower of Babel, and that they specifically avoided crafting windows for lighting in their covered seagoing vessels, because of fears that "they would be dashed in pieces" during the ocean voyage. Transparent window panes are a more recent invention, dating to the 11th century AD in Germany.

Apologist perspective
FairMormon, citing translations of the Bible, notes that 'the term "window" has been used to referred to an opening through which the wind could enter and which sometimes had doors or shutters (2 Kings 13:17) or lattices (Song of Solomon 2:9) and were not made of glass, so these parts of the window could be what is referred to as being "dashed to pieces". It is also suggested that the warning in Ether may have referred to the entire vessel being "dashed in pieces" if the structure was weakened by additional openings.

Uses of metal
The Book of Mormon mentions a number of metals, and the use of metal.

"Dross"
The word "dross" appears twice in the Book of Alma, dross being a byproduct of smelting metals.

In the Americas, pre-Inca civilizations of the central Andes in Peru had mastered the smelting of copper and silver at least six centuries before the first Europeans arrived in the 16th century, while never mastering the smelting of metals such as iron for use with weapon-craft. Ice core studies in Bolivia suggest copper smelting may have begun as early as 2000 BCE.

Apologist perspective
In addition to meaning a by-product of smelting, it can also mean "waste matter; refuse; any worthless matter separated from the better part; impure matter". However, Alma 34:29 specifically references dross as an item "which the refiners do cast out".

Apologists argue that use of the word dross does not necessarily imply the melting of metal but may be consistent with low temperature working of metal to eliminate inclusions or surrounding gangue material.

Steel and iron
Three instances of "steel" in the New World are mentioned in the Book of Mormon, one early amongst the Jaredites after their arrival around 2400 BC, one immediately after the Lehi party's arrival in the New World discussing Nephi's knowledge of steel at approximately 580 BC, and one of occurrence amongst the Nephites around 400 BC. Four instances of "iron" in the New World are mentioned in the Book of Mormon, one amongst the Jaredites around 1000 BC, one immediately after the Lehi party's arrival in the New World discussing Nephi's knowledge of iron at approximately 580 BC, and two of occurrence amongst the Nephites, one around 400 BC and the other around 160 BC.

Apologist perspective
Between 2004 and 2007, a Purdue University archaeologist, Kevin J. Vaughn, discovered a 2000-year-old iron ore mine near Nazca, Peru; however there is no evidence of smelting, and the hematite was apparently used to make pigments. He noted:

Even though ancient Andean people smelted some metals, such as copper, they never smelted iron like they did in the Old World .... Metals were used for a variety of tools in the Old World, such as weapons, while in the Americas, metals were used as prestige goods for the wealthy elite. 

An Olmec mining colony has been identified in the Cintalapa valley in Mexico. Among items excavated were partially worked blocks of ilmenite (a form of iron oxide) and magnetite (a magnetic iron oxide) and a fragment of an iron mirror, together with tools and San Lorenzo-style ceramics. These remains date to around 950 BC. Among the products produced from this material were Olmec mirrors which were formed from polished iron, beads, and figurines At the Olmec site of Las Bocas in Puebla, Mexico a particularly fine iron mosaic mirror was recovered and dated to around 1000 BC.

In the old world, there were two forms of ancient steeling of iron that did not involve smelting. The first is achieved through quenching and the second through carburizing iron by heating, hammering, and folding the iron in the presence of charcoal.

Additionally, apologists counter that the word "steel" may be referring to another alloy of hardened metal such as the hardened copper alloy that is translated with the word "steel" in the KJV. This alloy is in fact a hardened copper similar to bronze and not hardened iron.

Metal swords

The Book of Mormon makes numerous references to "swords" and their use in battle. What the swords are made of is mostly ambiguous except for two instances involving the Jaredites.  The first was an early battle (around 2400 BC) involving the king Shule which used "steel" swords. When the remnants of the Jaredite's abandoned cities were discovered (around 120 BC), the Book of Mormon narrative states that some swords were brought back "the hilts thereof have perished, and the blades thereof were cankered with rust", suggesting that these swords had metal blades.

Apologist perspective
Though usually more resistant to oxidation than iron, copper alloys are susceptible to bronze disease in humid conditions and hardened alloys of copper can oxidize. It is therefore not certain that the mention of "rust" is a reference to iron oxide.

Some studies have shown that metallurgy did exist in a primitive state in Mesoamerica during the Preclassic/Formative and Classic periods (which corresponds to the time period in the Book of Mormon). These metals include brass, iron ore, copper, silver, and gold. However, the metals were never used to make swords. The closest evidence to a pre-Columbian metal blade on Mesoamerica comes from the Maya, but those artifacts were not swords, but small copper axes used as tools.

Cimeters
"Cimeters" are mentioned in eight instances in the Book of Mormon stretching from approximately 500 BC to 51 BC. Critics argue this existed hundreds of years before the term "scimitar" was coined. The word "cimiter" is considered an anachronism since the word was never used by the Hebrews (from which some of the Book of Mormon peoples came) or any other civilization prior to 450 AD and because metal swords are not found in the Americas in the Book of Mormon timeframe. The word 'cimeterre' is found in the 1661 English dictionary Glossographia and is defined as "a crooked sword" and was part of the English language at the time that the Book of Mormon was translated. In the 7th century, scimitars generally first appeared among the Turko-Mongol nomads of Central Asia.

Apologist perspective
Apologists, including Michael R. Ash, and William Hamblin of FAIR, note that the Book of Mormon does not mention the materials that the "cimiters" were made out of, and postulate that the word was chosen by Joseph Smith as the closest workable English word for the weapon used by the Nephites that was not made of metal, and was short and curved.  Mormon scholar Matthew Roper has noted there are a variety of weapons with curved blades found in Mesoamerica.

Also, a possible correlate to the scimitar may be the sickle sword of ancient Egypt known as the khopesh, which was used from 3000 BC and is found on the Rosetta Stone dated to 196 BC. Eannatum, the king of Lagash, is shown on a Sumerian stele from 2500 BC equipped with a sickle sword.

System of exchange based on measures of grain using precious metals as a standard
The Book of Mormon details a system of measures used by the Nephite society described therein. However, the overall use of metal in ancient America seems to have been extremely limited. A more common exchange medium in Mesoamerica were cacao beans.

Linguistic anachronisms

Knowledge of a modified Hebrew and reformed Egyptian languages

The Book of Mormon account refers to various groups of literate peoples, at least one of which is described as using a language and writing system with roots in Hebrew and Egyptian. Fifteen examples of distinct scripts have been identified in pre-Columbian Mesoamerica, many from a single inscription.  Archaeological dating methods make it difficult to establish which was earliest (and hence the forebear from which the others developed) and a significant portion of the documented scripts have not been deciphered. None of the documented Mesoamerican language scripts have any relation to Hebrew or Egyptian. The Book of Mormon describes another literate culture, the Jaredites, but does not identify the language or writing system by name. The text that describes the Jaredites (Book of Ether) refers only to a language used prior to the alleged confounding of languages at the great tower, presumably a reference to the Tower of Babel.

Linguistic studies on the evolution of the spoken languages of the Americas agree with the widely held model that the initial colonization of the Americas by Homo sapiens occurred over 10,000 years ago.

FairMormon apologists argue that the Book of Mormon does not describe all of the original settlers of the Americas, but rather a subset of the larger population, who settled in a limited geographical setting. Thus, their language and writing may have had little to no impact on the culture of the rest of the population.

"Christ" and "Messiah"
The words "Christ" and "Messiah" are used several hundred times throughout the Book of Mormon. The first instance of the word "Christ" in the Book of Mormon dates to between 559 and 545 BC. The first instance of the word "Messiah" dates to about 600 BC.

"Christ" is the English transliteration of the Greek word  (transliterated precisely as Christós); it is relatively synonymous with the Hebrew word rendered "Messiah". Both words have the meaning of "anointed", and are used in the Bible to refer to "the Anointed One". In Greek translations of the Old Testament (including the Septuagint), the word "Christ" is used for the Hebrew "Messiah", and in Hebrew translations of the New Testament, the word "Messiah" is used for the Greek "Christ". Any usage in the Bible of the word "Christ" can be alternately translated as "Messiah" with no change in meaning (e.g. ). The word "Christ" is found in English dictionaries at the time of the translation of the plates so was not considered an exclusively Greek word at that time.

The Book of Mormon uses both terms throughout the book. In the vast majority of cases, it uses the terms in an identical manner as the Bible, where it does not matter which word is used:
And now, my sons, remember, remember that it is upon the rock of our Redeemer, who is Christ, the Son of God, that ye must build your foundation; that when the devil shall send forth his mighty winds, yea, his shafts in the whirlwind, yea, when all his hail and his mighty storm shall beat upon you, it shall have no power over you to drag you down to the gulf of misery and endless wo, because of the rock upon which ye are built, which is a sure foundation, a foundation whereon if men build they cannot fall.

And after he had baptized the Messiah with water, he should behold and bear record that he had baptized the Lamb of God, who should take away the sins of the world.

The Book of Mormon occasionally uses the word "Christ" in a way that is not interchangeable with "Messiah".

Richard Packham argues that the Greek word "Christ" in the Book of Mormon challenges the authenticity of the work since Joseph Smith clearly stated that, "There was no Greek or Latin upon the plates from which I, through the grace of the Lord, translated the Book of Mormon."

Apologist perspective
The Foundation for Apologetic Information & Research states that the word "Christ" is the Greek equivalent of the Hebrew word "Messiah" and that Smith simply chose the more familiar Greek word to translate the word that appeared in the language of the plates.

Hugh Nibley postulated that the word "Messiah" could have been derived from Arabic rather than Hebrew, although Arabic is not mentioned as one of the languages in which the golden plates were written.

Greek names
Joseph Smith stated in a letter to the editor of Times and Seasons, "There was no Greek or Latin upon the plates from which I, through the grace of the Lord, translated the Book of Mormon." The Book of Mormon contains some names which appear to be Greek, some of which are Hellenizations of Hebrew names (e.g. Antipas, Archeantus, Esrom, Ezias, Jonas, Judea, Lachoneus, and Zenos).

Other Greek names are non-biblical and their presence in the book is puzzling to both believers and skeptics since neither Smith nor the Nephites spoke Greek. One explanation has been offered by Stephen D. Ricks. Writing in the LDS magazine Ensign he said that though the language of the Mulekites is not put forward in the Book of Mormon, the party could have included Phoenicians who had regular contact with the Greeks or perhaps some Greek sailor or traders were also in the initial group.  In addition, Greek names have occurred as loan names in ancient Hebrew.

"Church" and "synagogue"
The word "church" first occurs in 1 Nephi 4:26, where a prophet named Nephi disguises himself as Laban, a prominent man in Jerusalem whom Nephi had slain:And he [Laban's servant], supposing that I spake of the brethren of the church, and that I was truly that Laban whom I had slain, wherefore he did follow me.

According to the Book of Mormon, this exchange happened in Jerusalem, around 600 BC. The meaning of the word "church" in the Book of Mormon is more comparable to usage in the KJV than modern English. The concept of a church, meaning a convocation of believers, existed among the House of Israel prior to Christianity. For instance, Psalms  speaks of praising the Lord "in the congregation of the saints"; the Septuagint contains the Greek word "ecclesia" for "congregation", which is also translated as "church" in the New Testament. The Book of Mormon using the word "church" in the same "style" as the KJV is seen by some apologists as support for the Book of Mormon.

A similar question regards the word "synagogue", found in Alma 16:13:And Alma and Amulek went forth preaching repentance to the people in their temples, and in their sanctuaries, and also in their synagogues, which were built after the manner of the Jews.

Scholars note that synagogues did not exist in their modern form before the destruction of the temple and the Babylonian captivity. The oldest known synagogue is located in Delos, Greece, and has been dated to 150 BC.  References to synagogues have been found in Egypt as early as the 3rd Century BC.

The name "Sam" as an anachronism
Critics Jerald and Sandra Tanner and Marvin W. Cowan contend that certain linguistic properties of the Book of Mormon provide evidence that the book was fabricated by Joseph Smith.
These critics cite as a linguistic anachronism the Americanized name "Sam" (1 Nephi 2:5,17).

Apologist perspective
Apologists assert that it is potentially a hypocoristicon from Samuel representing the common Semitic vocable šm and would most likely mean "the name", "Name", or even "descendant/offspring" among other Near Eastern linguistic possibilities. Gee, Roper and Tvedtnes report that the name "Sam" is found on a bronze ring-mounted seal dated in the 7th century BC. They also note that the name "Samuel" in Hebrew is a combination of two words—Shem and El. In early Hebrew, the same letter was used for "s" and "sh" and vowels were not specified. Judges 12:6 demonstrates that the tribe of Joseph pronounced the letter that Shem began with as "s".

The name "Isabel" as an anachronism
The name Isabel appears in the Book of Mormon at Alma 39:3.  According to the Book of Mormon, Isabel lived about 74 BC.  Isabel is a female name of Spanish origin.  It originates as the medieval Spanish form of Elisabeth (ultimately Hebrew Elisheva).  The name arose in the 12th century AD well after the Isabel in the Book of Mormon.

Anachronisms apparently perpetuated from King James's translation

A significant portion of the Book of Mormon quotes from the brass plates, which purport to be another source of Old Testament writings mirroring those of the Bible. In many cases, the biblical quotations in the English-language Book of Mormon, are close, or identical to the equivalent sections of the KJV. Critics consider several Book of Mormon anachronisms to originate in the KJV.

"Satyr"
In 2 Nephi 23:21, the Book of Mormon quotes Isaiah 13:21, which mentions a "satyr". Satyrs are creatures from Greek mythology, which are half-man, half-goat. The KJV translates Isaiah 34:14 thus:

The wild beasts of the desert shall also meet with the wild beasts of the island, and the satyr shall cry to his fellow; the screech owl also shall rest there, and find for herself a place of rest. ("וְרָבְצוּ־שָׁם צִיִּים וּמָלְאוּ בָתֵּיהֶם אֹחִים וְשָׁכְנוּ שָׁם בְּנֹות יַֽעֲנָה וּשְׂעִירִים יְרַקְּדוּ־")

Other English-language versions of the Bible, including the New International Version, translate the word  (sa`iyr) as "wild goat"; other translations include "monkey" and "dancing devil".

Doctrinal anachronisms

Anti-Universalist rhetoric

Universalism, or the doctrine that all humanity would be saved, was a prominent theology that peaked in popularity in the northeastern United States in the 1820s and 1830s. The Book of Mormon contains a number of sermons and passages that use anti-Universalist religious arguments common to that time and place, not known to have occurred in any ancient American setting. The existence of 19th century anti-Universalist arguments and rhetoric in the Book of Mormon has been pointed out as anachronistic by various scholars, including Fawn M. Brodie and Dan Vogel.

Apologist perspective
LDS Church scholars generally argue that because Book of Mormon prophets were shown by Jesus Christ the modern era, and the audience of the Book of Mormon was people in the modern era, that Book of Mormon prophets would have been intimately familiar with anti-Universalist rhetoric and purposefully used it to convince modern-day readers.

Satisfaction theory of atonement
The satisfaction theory of atonement was a medieval theological development, created to explain how God could be both merciful and just through an infinite atonement, and not known to have appeared in any ancient American setting.

See also

 Archaeology and the Book of Mormon
 Columbian Exchange
 Dené–Yeniseian languages
 Genetics and the Book of Mormon
 Historicity of the Book of Mormon
 Linguistics and the Book of Mormon
 List of pre-Columbian engineering projects in the Americas
 Pre-Columbian trans-oceanic contact

References

Sources 

 

.

 
 

Criticism of Mormonism
Anachronisms